John William Wood Sr. (December 28, 1855 – October 31, 1928) was one of the founders of Benson, North Carolina.

Wood rode to Benson early each morning on a mule and wagon from his home place near Peacocks Crossroads, North Carolina (formerly, Meadow).
After having served on the Board of Education and for years as a County Commissioner, where he was known to be a "watchdog" of the treasury, he was elected to a term in the State House of Representatives in 1927. Meadow School, at his home of Peacocks Crossroads, NC was built on land donated by John William Wood Sr.

1855 births
1928 deaths
County commissioners in North Carolina
Members of the North Carolina House of Representatives
People from Benson, North Carolina